This is a list of state leaders in the 12th century (1101–1200) AD, of the Holy Roman Empire.
Holy Roman Empire in Germany

Main

Holy Roman Empire, Kingdom of Germany (complete list, complete list) –
Henry IV, Holy Roman Emperor (1084–1105), King (1053–1087)
Henry V, Holy Roman Emperor (1111–1125), King (1099–1125)
Lothair II, Holy Roman Emperor (1133–1137), King (1125–1137)
Conrad III, King (1138–1152)
Henry Berengar, co-King (1138–1150)
Frederick I, Holy Roman Emperor (1155–1190), King (1152–1190)
Henry VI, Holy Roman Emperor (1191–1197), King (1190–1197)
Philip, King (1198–1208)
Otto IV, Holy Roman Emperor (1209–1215), King (1198–1209)

Austrian

Margraviate/ Duchy of Austria (complete list) –
Leopold III the Good, Margrave (1095–1136)
Leopold the Generous, Margrave (1137–1141)
Henry II Jasomirgott, Margrave (1141–1156), Duke (1156–1177)
Leopold V the Virtuous, Duke (1177–1194)
Frederick I the Catholic, Duke (1195–1198)
Leopold VI the Glorious, Duke (1198–1230)

County of Bregenz (complete list) –
Rudolf I, Couint (1097–1160)

Prince-Bishopric of Brixen (complete list) –
Hugo, Prince-bishop (1100–1125)
Reginbert, Prince-bishop (1125/29, 1138–1140)
Hartmann of Brixen, Prince-bishop (1140–1164)
Otto of Andechs, Prince-bishop (1165–1170)
Heinrich of Fugen, Prince-bishop (1170–1173/74)
Richer of Hohenburg, Prince-bishop (1173/74–1177)
Heinrich of Berchtesgaden, Prince-bishop (1177–1196)
Eberhard of Regensberg, Prince-bishop (1196/98–1200)
Konrad of Rodank, Prince-bishop (1200–1216)

Margraviate of Burgau –
, Margrave (?–1241)
, Margrave (?–1293/94)
, Margrave (?–c.1301)

Duchy of Carinthia (complete list) –
Henry IV, Duke (1090–1122)
Henry IV, Duke (1122–1123 )
Engelbert, Duke (1123–1134)
Ulrich I, Duke (1134–1144)
Henry V, Duke (1144–1161)
Herman, Duke (1161–1181)
Ulrich II, Duke (1181–1201)

Prince-Bishopric of Chur (complete list) –
Ulrich III von Tegerfelden, Prince-bishop (1170–1179)
Bruno von Ehrenfels, Prince-bishop (1179–1180)
Henry II, Prince-bishop (1180–1193)
Arnold II, Prince-bishop (1210–1221)
Rudolf II, Prince-bishop (1223–1226)
Berthold, Prince-bishop (1226–1233)
Ulrich IV, Prince-bishop (1233–1237)
Volcnand, Prince-bishop (1238–1251)
Heinrich von Höwen, Prince-bishop (1441−?)
Ulrich III. von Tegerfelden, Prince-bishop (1170–1179)
Bruno von Ehrenfels, Prince-bishop (1179–1180)
Heinrich II., Prince-bishop (1180–1194)
Reinher della Torre, Prince-bishop (1194–1209)

County of Gorizia (complete list) –
Meinhard I, Count (1122–1142)
Henry II, Count (1142–1150)
Engelbert II, Count (1150–1191)
Engelbert III, Count (1191–1220)

March/ Duchy of Styria (complete list) –
Ottokar II, Margrave (1082–1122)
Leopold, Margrave (1122–1129)
Ottokar III, Margrave (1129–1164)
Ottokar IV, Margrave (1164–1180), Duke (1180–1192)
Leopold V of Austria, Duke (1192–1194)
Leopold VI of Austria, Duke (1194–1230)

Prince-Bishopric of Trent (complete list) –
Adalberon, Prince-bishop (1084–1106)
Gebhard, Prince-bishop (1106–1120)
Albert I, Prince-bishop (1120–1124)
Altmann, Prince-bishop (1124–1149)
Arnold II, Prince-bishop (1149–1154)
Eberhard, Prince-bishop (1154–1156)
St. Albert II, Prince-bishop (1156–1177)
Salomon, Prince-bishop (1177–1183)
Albert III di Madruzzo, Prince-bishop (1184–1188)
Conrad II di Biseno, Prince-bishop (1188–1205)

County of Tyrol (complete list) –
Albert I, Count (?–1078)
Albert II, Count (1055–1101)
Albert III, Count (1101–1165)
Berthold I, Count (1165–1180)
Berthold II, Count (1180–1181)
Henry I, Count (1180–1202)

Bavarian

Duchy of Bavaria (complete list) –
Welf I, Duke (1070–1077, 1096–1101)
Welf II, Duke (1101–1120)
Henry IX the Black, Duke (1120–1126)
Henry X, Duke (1126–1138)
Leopold I, Duke (1139–1141)
Henry XI Jasomirgott, Duke (1143–1156)
Henry XII the Lion, Duke (1156–1180)
Otto the Redhead, Duke (1180–1183)
Agnes of Loon, Regent (1183–1191)
Louis I, Duke (1183–1231)

Berchtesgaden Prince-Provostry (complete list) –
Bernhard I of Schönstätten, Provost (1194–1201)

Landgraviate of Leuchtenberg (de:complete list) –
Gebhardt I, Landgrave (?–1146)
Gebhardt II, Landgrave (1146–1168)
Diepold I, Landgrave (1168–1209)

Prince-Abbey of Niedermünster (complete list) –
Uda II von Marburg, Abbess (1089–1103)
Richenza II von Zolling, Abbess (1103–1109)
Mathilde II von Kirchberg, Abbess (1109–1116)
Richenza III von Abensberg, Abbess (1116–1126)
Richenza IV von Dornburg, Abbess (1126–1130)
Heilka III von Kirchberg, Abbess (1130–1136)
Kunigunde II von Kirchberg, Abbess (1136–1177)
Tutta II von Falkenstein, Abbess (1177–1180)
Adelheid I von Wolffershausen, Abbess (1180–1190)
Bertha von Frontenhausen, Abbess (1190–1197)
Heilka IV von Rotheneck, Abbess (1197–1218)

Margraviate of the Nordgau (complete list) –
Diepold III, Margrave (1093–1146)

Imperial County of Ortenburg (complete list) –
Rapoto I, Count (1120–1186)
Rapoto II, Count (1186–1231)

Pappenheim (complete list) –
Henry III, Lord (early 12th century)
Ernest, Lord (?–1170)
Henry I, Lord (1170–1193)
Rudolph I, Lord (1193–1221)

Prince-Bishopric of Passau (complete list) –
Ulrich, Prince-Bishop (1092–1121)
Reginmar, Prince-Bishop (1121–1138)
Reginbert of Hagenau, Prince-Bishop (1138–1147/48)
Conrad I of Babenberg, Prince-Bishop (1148/1149–1164)
Rupert I, Prince-Bishop (1164–1165)
Albo, Prince-Bishop (1165–1169)
Henry I of Berg, Prince-Bishop (1169–1172)
Diepold of Berg, Prince-Bishop (1172–1190)
Wolfger of Erla, Prince-Bishop (1191–1204)

Prince-Bishopric of Regensburg (complete list) –
Heinrich I of Wolfratshausen, Prince-bishop (1132–1155)
Hartwig II of Ortenburg, Prince-bishop (1155–1164)
Eberhard the Swabian, Prince-bishop (1165–1167)
Konrad II of Raitenbuch, Prince-bishop (1167–1185)
Konrad III of Laichling, Prince-bishop (1186–1204)

Prince-Archbishopric of Salzburg (complete list) –
Eberhard II of Regensburg, Prince-archbishop (1200–1246)

Bohemian

Duchy/ Kingdom of Bohemia (complete list) –
Bořivoj II, Duke (1100–1107, 1117–1120)
Svatopluk the Lion, Duke (1107–1109)
Vladislaus I, Duke (1109–1117, 1120–1125)
Sobeslaus I, Duke (1125–1140)
Vladislaus II, Duke (1140–1158), King (1158–1172)
Frederick, Duke (1172–1173, 1178–1189)
Sobeslaus II, Duke (1173–1178)
Conrad II Otto, Duke (1189–1191)
Wenceslaus II, Duke (1191–1192)
Bretislaus III, Duke (1193–1197)
Vladislaus III Henry, Duke (1197)
Ottokar I, Duke (1192–1193, 1197–1198), King (1198–1230)

Margraviate of Moravia (complete list) –
Conrad II Otto, Margrave (1182–1189)
Vladislaus I Henry, Margrave (1197–1222)

Burgundian-Low Countries

County of Burgundy (complete list) –
William II the German, Count (1097–1125)
William III the Child, Count (1125–1127)
Stephen I the Rash, Count (1097–1102)
Reginald III, Count (1102–1148)
Beatrice I, Countess (1148–1184)
Frederick Barbarossa, Count (1156–1190)
Otto I, Count (1190–1200)
Joan I, Countess (1200–1205)

Landgraviate/ Duchy of Brabant(complete list) –
Godfrey I, Landgrave (1095–1139)
Henry III, Landgrave (1085/1086–1095)
Godfrey I, Landgrave (1095–1139)
Godfrey II, Landgrave (1139–1142)
Godfrey III, Landgrave (1142–1190)
Henry I, Duke (1183/1184–1235)

County of Flanders (complete list) –
Robert II, Count (1093–1111)
Baldwin VII Hapkin, Count (1111–1119)
Charles I the Good, Count (1119–1127)
William I Clito, Count (1127–1128)
Theodoric, Count (1128–1168)
Philip I, Count (1168–1191)
Margaret I, Countess (1191–1194)
Baldwin VIII, Count (1191–1194)
Baldwin IX, Count (1194–1205)

County of Hainaut (complete list) –
Baldwin III, Count (1098–1120)
Baldwin IV, Count (1120–1171)
Baldwin V, Count (1171–1195)
Baldwin VI, Count (1195–1205)

County of Holland (complete list) –
Floris II, Count (1091–1121)
Dirk VI, Count (1121–1157)
Floris III, Count (1157–1190)
Dirk VII, Count (1190–1203)

County/ Duchy of Limburg (complete list) –
Henry I, Count (1082–1119)
Waleran II, Duke (1119–1139)
Henry II, Duke (1139–1167)
Henry III, Duke (1165–1221)

Duchy of Lower Lorraine (complete list) –
Henry I, Duke (1101–1106)
Godfrey VI/I, Duke (1106–1128)
Waleran, Duke (1128–1139)
Godfrey VII/II, Duke (1139–1142)
Godfrey VIII/VIII, Duke (1142–1190)
title passes to the Duke of Brabant

County of Namur (complete list) –
Albert III, Count (1063–1102)
Godfrey I, Count (1102–1139)
Henry I the Blind, Count (1139–1189) 
Alice, Countess, Baldwin I, Margrave (1189–1195)
Philip I, Margrave (1195–1212)

Franconian

County of Castell (complete list) –
Rupert I, Count (1200–1223)

Prince-Bishopric of Würzburg (complete list) –
Herold von Hochheim, Prince-bishop (1168–1170)
Reginhard von Abenberg, Prince-bishop (1171–1186)
Gottfried I von Spitzenberg-Helfenstein, Prince-bishop (1186–1190)
Philip of Swabia, Prince-bishop (1190–1191)
Heinrich III of Berg, Prince-bishop (1191–1197)
Gottfried II von Hohenlohe, Prince-bishop (1197)
Konrad von Querfurt, Prince-bishop (1197–1202)

Electoral Rhenish

Archbishopric of Cologne (complete list) –
Friedrich I, Prince-Archbishop (1100–1131)
Bruno II von Berg, Prince-Archbishop (1131–1137)
Hugo von Sponheim, Prince-Archbishop (1137)
Arnold I, Prince-Archbishop (1138–1151)
Arnold II von Wied, Prince-Archbishop (1152–1156)
Friedrich II von Berg, Prince-Archbishop (1156–1158)
Rainald of Dassel, Prince-Archbishop (1159–1167)
Philipp von Heinsberg, Prince-Archbishop (1167–1191)
Bruno III von Berg, Prince-Archbishop (1191–1192)
Adolf I von Berg, Prince-Archbishop (1192–1205)

Prince-Bishopric of Mainz (complete list) –
Rudhart, Prince-archbishop (1088–1109)
Adalbert I von Saarbrücken, Prince-archbishop (1111–1137)
Adalbert II von Saarbrücken, Prince-archbishop (1138–1141)
Markholf, Prince-archbishop (1141–1142)
Henry I, Prince-archbishop (1142–1153)
Arnold von Selenhofen, Prince-archbishop (1153–1160)
Christian I, Prince-archbishop (1160–1161)
Rudolf of Zähringen, opposing Prince-archbishop (1160–1161)
Conrad I of Wittelsbach, Prince-archbishop (1161–1165)
Christian I, Prince-archbishop (1165–1183)
Conrad I of Wittelsbach (restored), Prince-archbishop (1183–1200)
Luitpold von Scheinfeld, Prince-archbishop (1200–1208)

County Palatine of the Rhine (complete list) –
Siegfried of Ballenstedt, Count (1095–1113)
Gottfried of Kalw, Count (1113–1129)
William of Ballenstedt, Count (1129–1139)
Henry IV Jasomirgott, Count (1139–1142)
Hermann III of Stahleck, Count (1142–1155)
Conrad of Hohenstaufen, Count (1156–1195)
Henry V, Count (1195–1213)

Elector-Bishopric of Trier (complete list) –
Egilbert, Prince-bishop (1079–1101)
Bruno, Prince-bishop (1101–1124)
Gottfrid, Prince-bishop (1124–1127)
Meginher, Prince-bishop (1127–1130)
Albero de Montreuil, Prince-bishop (1131–1152)
Hillin of Falmagne, Prince-bishop (1152–1169)
Arnold I of Vaucourt, Prince-bishop (1169–1183)
Folmar of Karden, Prince-bishop (1183–1189)
John I, Archbishop-elector (1189–1212)

Lower Rhenish–Westphalian

County of Bentheim (complete list) –
Otto of Salm, Count (1115–1149)
Sophia, Countess (1149–1176) and Dirk of Holland, Count (1149–1157)
Otto I, Count (1176–1207)

Duchy of Cleves (complete list) –
Dietrich I, Count (1092–1119)
Arnold I, Count (1119–1147)
Dietrich II, Count (1147–1172)
Dietrich III, Count (1172–1188)
Dietrich IV, Count (1188–1198)
Arnold II, Count (1198–1201)

Essen Abbey (complete list) –
Lutgarde, Princess-Abbess (c.1088–1118)
Oda, Princess-Abbess (1119–1137)
Ermentrude, Princess-Abbess (c.1140–post-1154)
Hedwig von Wied, Princess-Abbess (1154–c.1172)
Elisabeth I, Princess-Abbess (1172–pre-1216)

County of Guelders (complete list) –
Gerard I, Count (pre-1096–c.1129)
Gerard II, Count (1129–c.1131)
Henry I, Count (c.1131–1182)
Otto I, Count (1182–1207)

Herford Abbey (complete list) –
Jutta of Arnsberg, Abbess (1147–post-1162)
Ludgard I, Abbess (pre-1163–post-1170)

Prince-Bishopric of Liège (complete list) –
Otbert, Prince-Bishop (1091–1119)
Frederick of Namur, Prince-Bishop (1119–1121)
Albero I of Leuven, Prince-Bishop (1122–1128)
Alexander I, Prince-Bishop (1128–1135)
Albero II of Chiny-Namur, Prince-Bishop (1135–1145)
Henry II of Leez, Prince-Bishop (1145–1164)
Alexander II, Prince-Bishop (1164–1167)
Rudolf of Zähringen, Prince-Bishop (1167–1191)
Saint Albert of Leuven, Prince-Bishop (1191–1192)
Lothaire of Hochstaden, Prince-Bishop (1192–1193)
Simon of Limbourg, Prince-Bishop (1193–1195)
Albert of Cuyck, Prince-Bishop (1195–1200)
Hugh of Pierrepont, Prince-Bishop (1200–1229)

County of Luxemburg (complete list) –
William I, Count (1096–1131)
Conrad II, Count (1131–1136)
Henry IV, Count (1136–1189)
Otto, Count (1196–1197)
Ermesinde, Countess (1197–1247)

County of Mark (complete list) –
Eberhard I, Count (1160–1180)
Frederick I, Count (1180–1198)
Adolph I, Count (1198–1249)

Prince-Bishopric of Münster (complete list) –
Hermann II of Katzenelnbogen, Prince-bishop (1180–1202)

County of Oldenburg (complete list) –
Elimar I, Count (1101–1108)
Elimar II, Count (1108–1143)
Christian I the Quarrelsome, Count (1143–1168)
Maurice I, Count (1168–1211)

County of Sayn (complete list) –
Eberhard I, Count (1139–1176)
Godfrey II/III of Sponheim, Regent, (1181–1220)
Henry I/II, co-Count (1176–1203)
Eberhard II, co-Count (1176–1202)

County of Schaumburg (complete list) –
Adolf I, Count (1106–1130)
Adolf II, Count (1130–1164)
Adolf III, Count (1164–1225)

Prince-Bishopric of Utrecht (complete list) –
Burchard, Prince-bishop (1100–1112)
Godbald, Prince-bishop (1114–1127)
Andreas van Cuijk, Prince-bishop (1127/28–1139)
Hartbert, Prince-bishop (1139–1150)
Herman van Horne, Prince-bishop (1151–1156)
Godfrey van Rhenen, Prince-bishop (1156–1178)
Baldwin II van Holland, Prince-bishop (1178–1196)
Arnold I van Isenburg, Prince-bishop (1196–1197)
Dirk I, Prince-bishop (1197)
Dirk II van Are), Prince-bishop (1197/98–1212)

Prince-Bishopric of Verden (complete list) –
Tammo of Verden, Prince-Bishop (1180–1188)
Rudolph of Verden, Prince-Bishop (1189–1205)

County of Wied (complete list) –
Richwin IV, Count (1093–1112)
Matfried III, Count (1093–1129)
Burchard, Count (?–1152)
Siegfried, Count (1129–c.1161)
Dietrich/Theodoric, Count (c.1162–c.1197)
George, Count (1197–1219)

Upper Rhenish

County of Bar (complete list) –
Theodoric II, Count (1093–1105)
Reginald I, Count (1105–1150)
Reginald II, Count (1150–1170)
Henry I, Count (1170–1189)
Theobald I, Count (1189–1214)

Prince-Bishopric of Basel (complete list) –
Burchard of Basle, Prince-bishop (1072–1105)
Rudolf IV von Homburg, Prince-bishop (1107–1122)
Berthold von Neuenburg, Prince-bishop (1122–1133)
Adalbert IV. von Froburg, Prince-bishop (1133–1137)
Ortlieb von Froburg, Prince-bishop (1138–1164)
Ludwig Garewart, Prince-bishop (1164–1179)
Hugo von Hasenburg, Prince-bishop (1180)
Heinrich I von Horburg, Prince-bishop (1180–1191)
Leuthold I von Rotheln, Prince-bishop (1192–1213)

Isenburg-Covern (complete list) –
Gerlach II, Count (1158–1217)

Isenburg-Isenburg (complete list) –
Rembold IV, Count (1137–1162)
Rembold V, Count (1152–1195)
Bruno I, Count (1152–1199)

Isenburg-Kempenich (complete list) –
Siegfried, Count (1142–1153)
Reynold, Count (1153–?)
Theodoric I and Florentin, Count (12th century)
Salentin and Rosemann, Count (12th/13th century)

County of Leiningen (de:complete list) –
Emich I, Count (fl.1127),
Emich II, Count (fl.1143) to 1179
Friedrich, Count (fl.1189)
Emich III, Count (fl.1193–1208)

Duchy of Lorraine (complete list) –
Theodoric II, Duke (1070–1115)
Simon I, Duke (1115–1138)
Matthias I, Duke (1138–1176)
Simon II, Duke (1176–1205)

County of Nassau-Saarbrücken (complete list) –
Siegbert, Count (1080–1105)
Frederick, Count (1105–1135)
Simon I, Count (1135–1182)
Simon II, Count (1182–1207)

Salm (complete list) –
Andrea II, Count (1088–1138)
Herman, Count (1138–1140)
Henry, Count (1140–1165)

Lower Salm (complete list) –
Frederick I, Count (1163–1172)
Frederick II, Count (1172–1210)

Upper Salm (complete list) –
Henry I, Count (1165–1210)

Prince-Bishopric of Sion (complete list) –
Vilencus, Prince-Bishop (1107–1116)
Boson, Prince-Bishop (1135–1138)
Guarinus of Sitten, Prince-Bishop (1138–1150)
Louis, Prince-Bishop (1150–c.1162)
Amédée of La Tour, Prince-Bishop (1162–c.1168)
Guillaume of Blonay, Prince-Bishop (1176–1177)
Conon, Prince-Bishop (1179–1181/84)
Guillaume of Candie, Prince-Bishop (c.1184–1196)
Nantelme of Écublens, Prince-Bishop (1196–1203)

Prince-Bishopric of Speyer (complete list) –
Johann I of Kraichgau, Prince-bishop (1090–1104)
Gebhard II of Urach, Prince-bishop (1105–1107)
Bruno of Saarbrücken, Prince-bishop (1107–1123)
Arnold II, Prince-bishop (1124–1126)
Siegfried I, Prince-bishop (1127–1146)
Günther, Prince-bishop (1146–1161)
Ulrich I of Dürrmenz, Prince-bishop (1161–1163)
Gottfried II, Prince-bishop (1164–1167)
Rabodo, Count of Lobdaburg, Prince-bishop (1167–1176)
Konrad II, Prince-bishop (1176–1178)
Ulrich II of Rechberg, Prince-bishop (1178–1187)
Otto II, Count of Henneberg, Prince-bishop (1187–1200)
Conrad III of Scharfenberg, Prince-bishop (1200–1224)

Prince-Bishopric of Strasbourg (complete list) –
Kuno, Prince-Bishop (1100–1123)
Bruno von Hochberg, Prince-Bishop (1123–1126)
Eberhard, Prince-Bishop (1126–1127)
Bruno von Hochberg, Prince-Bishop (1129–1131)
Gebhard von Urach, Prince-Bishop (1131–1141)
Burkhard I, Prince-Bishop (1141–1162)
Rudolf, Prince-Bishop (1162–1179)
Konrad I, Prince-Bishop (1179–1180)
Heinrich I von Hasenburg, Prince-Bishop (1181–1190)
Konrad II von Hühnenburg, Prince-Bishop (1190–1202)

Prince-Bishopric of Worms (complete list) –
Adalbert II of Saxony, Prince-bishop (1070–1107)
Erzo, Prince-bishop (1107–115)
Arnold II, Prince-bishop (1110–1131)
Burchard II von Asorn, Prince-bishop (1120–1149)
Konrad I von Steinach, Prince-bishop (1150–1171)
Konrad II von Sternberg, Prince-bishop (1171–1192)
Henryk I van Maastricht, Prince-bishop (1192–1195)
Luitpold von Schonfeld, Prince-bishop (1196–1217)

Lower Saxon

Duchy of Saxony (complete list) –
Magnus, Duke (1072–1106)
Lothair I, Duke (1106–1137)
Henry II the Proud, Duke (1137–1139)
Albert I the Bear, Duke (1139–1142)
Henry III the Lion, Duke (1142–1180)
Bernhard, Duke (1180–1212)

Prince-Archbishopric of Bremen (complete list) –
Siegfried of Anhalt, Prince-archbishop (1180–1184)
Hartwig II, Prince-archbishop (1185–1190)
Valdemar of Denmark, Prince-archbishop (1192)
Hartwig II, Prince-archbishop (1192–1207)

Gandersheim Abbey (complete list) –
Adelheid III, Princess-Abbess (1096–1104)
Frederun, Princess-Abbess (1104–1111)
Agnes I, Princess-Abbess (1111–1125)
Bertha I, Princess-Abbess (1126–1130)
Liutgard II, Princess-Abbess (1130/31–1152)
Adelheid IV, Princess-Abbess (1152/53–1184)
Adelheid V, Princess-Abbess (1184–1196)
Mechthild I, Princess-Abbess (1196–1223)

County of Holstein (complete list) –
Adolf I, Count (1111–1130)
Adolf II, Count (1130–1137, 1143–1164)
Henry of Badewide, Count (1137–1143)
Matilda of Schwarzburg-Käfernburg, Regent (1164–c.1174)
Adolf III, Count (1164–1203)

Prince-bishopric of Lübeck (complete list) –
Henry I, Prince-bishop (1180–1182)
Conrad II, Prince-bishop (1183–1184)
Theodoric I, Prince-bishop (1186–1210)

Prince-Archbishopric of Magdeburg (complete list) –
Wichmann von Seeburg, Prince-bishop (1180–1192)
Ludolf of Koppenstedt, Prince-archbishop (1192–1205)

Mecklenburg (complete list) –
Pribislav, Prince of Obotrites (1160–1167), Prince of Mecklenburg (1167–1178)
Nicholas I, co-Lord (1178–1200)
Henry Borwin I, co-Lord (1178–1219)

Obotrites (complete list) –
Henry, Prince (1093–1127)
Niklot, Prince (1131–1160)
Pribislav, Prince of Obotrites (1160–1167), Prince of Mecklenburg (1167–1178)

County of Oldenburg (complete list) –
Elimar I, Count (1101–1108)
Elimar II, Count (1108–1143)
Christian I the Quarrelsome, Count (1143–1168)
Maurice I, Count (1168–1211)

Upper Saxon

County of Anhalt (complete list) –
Otto I the Rich, Count (1076/83–1123)
Albert I the Bear, Count (1123–1170)
Bernhard, Count (1170–1212)

Prince-Bishopric of Brandenburg (complete list) –
Wilmar, Prince-bishop (1161/65–1173)
Siegfried I, Prince-bishop (1173–1179)

Margraviate of Brandenburg (complete list) –
Albert I the Bear, Margrave (1157–1170)
Otto I, Margrave (1170–1184)
Otto II the Generous, Margrave (1184–1205)

Eastern March (complete list) –
Henry I, Margrave (1075–1103)
Henry II, Margrave (1103–1123)
Wiprecht, Margrave (1123–1124)
Albert, Margrave (1123–1128)
Henry III, Margrave (1128–1135)
hereafter known as March of Lusatia

Hevelli –
Meinfried, Prince (?–1127)
Pribislav-Henry, Prince (?–1150)

Margravate of Meissen (complete list) –
Henry I, Margrave (1089–1103)
Thimo, Margrave (1103)
Henry II, Margrave (1104–1123)
Wiprecht, Margrave (1123–1124)
Herman II, Margrave (1124–1130)
Conrad, Margrave (1130–1156)
Otto II, Margrave (1156–1190)
Albert I, Margrave (1190–1195)
Dietrich I, Margrave (1198–1221)

Northern March (complete list) –
Lothair Udo III, Margrave (1087–1106)
Rudolf I, Margrave (1106–1112)
Helperich von Plötzkau, Margrave (1112–1114)
Henry II, Margrave (1114–1128)
Udo IV, Margrave (1128–1130)
Conrad, Margrave (1130–1133)
Rudolf II, Margrave (1133–1134)
Albert the Bear, Margrave (1134–1170)

Duchy of Pomerania (complete list) –
Świętobor, non-dynastic Duke (1060–1106)
Świętopełk I, non-dynastic Duke (1106–1113)
Wartislaw I, Duke (1120s–1135)
Racibor I, Duke (1135–1156)

Duchy of Pomerelia (complete list) –
Świętobor, Duke (c.1100)
Swietopelk I, Duke (1109/13–1121)
Sobieslaw I, Duke (1150s–1177/79)
Sambor I, Duke (1177/79–1205)

Pomerania-Demmin (complete list) –
Casimir I, Duke (1156–1180)
Wartislaw II, Duke (1180–1184)
Bogusław I, Duke of Pomerania-Stettin (1156–1187), of Pomerania-Demmin (1184–1187)
Anastasia of Greater Poland, Regent (1187–1208)
Casimir II, Duke (1187–1219)

Pomerania-Schlawe-Stolp (complete list) –
Swietopelk Raciborovic, Duke (1156–c.1190)
, Duke (c.1190–1223)'

Pomerania-Stettin (complete list) –
Bogusław I, Duke of Pomerania-Stettin (1156–1187), of Pomerania-Demmin (1184–1187)
Anastasia of Greater Poland, Regent (1187–1208)
Bogislaw II, Duke (1187–1220)

Landgraviate of Thuringia (complete list) –
Louis the Springer, Count (1056–1123)
Louis I, Count (1123–1131), Landgrave (1131–1140)
Louis II the Iron, Landgrave (1140–1172)
Louis III the Pious, Landgrave (1172–1190)
Hermann I the Hard, Landgrave (1190–1217)

Swabian

Duchy of Swabia (complete list) –
Frederick I, contested Duke (1079–1105)
Frederick II the One-Eyed, Duke (1105–1147)
Frederick III Barbarossa, Duke (1147–1152)
Frederick IV, Duke (1152–1167)
Frederick V, Duke (1167–1170)
Frederick VI, Duke (1170–1191)
Conrad II, Duke (1191–1196)
Philip, Duke (1196–1208)

Prince-Bishopric of Augsburg (complete list) –
Hermann of Vohburg, Prince-bishop (1096–1133)
Walter I of Dillingen, Prince-bishop (1133–1152)
Konrad of Hirscheck, Prince-bishop (1152–1167)
Hartwig I of Lierheim, Prince-bishop (1167–1184)
Udalschalk, Prince-bishop (1184–1202)

Margraviate of Baden (complete list) –
Herman II, Margrave (1073–1130)
Herman III the Great, Margrave (1130–1160)
Herman IV, Margrave (1160–1190)

 (complete list) –
Herman V, Margrave (1190–1243)

 (complete list) –
Henry I, Margrave (1190–1231)

Prince-Bishopric of Constance (complete list) –
, Prince-bishop (1155–1165)
Otto von Habsburg, Prince-bishop (1165–1174)
, Prince-bishop (1174–1183)
, Prince-bishop (1183–1189)
, Prince-bishop (1190–1206)

Ellwangen Abbey (complete list) –
Adalger, Prince-abbot (c.1100)
Ebo, Prince-abbot (?–1113)
Richardus Rufus?, Prince-abbot (c.1120)
Helmerich, Prince-abbot (c.1124)
Adalbert I of Ronsberg, Prince-abbot (1136?–1173)
Adalbert II of Künsberg?, Prince-abbot (1173–1188)
Kuno, Prince-abbot (1188–1221)

County of Hohenberg (complete list) –
Burkhard III, Count (post-1152–post-1193)
Friedrich, Count (post-1193–1195)
Burkhard IV, Count (1195–1217/25)

Princely Abbey of Kempten (complete list) –
Eberhard III, Prince-abbot (1094–1105)
Mangold, Prince-abbot (1105–1109)
de:Hartmann, Prince-abbot (1109–1114)
Totto II of Crisheim, Prince-abbot (1125–1127)
Friedrich II Festenberger, Prince-abbot (1127–1138)
Frederick III of Klingenstein, Prince-abbot (1138–1142)
Robert Konrad of Scheideck, Prince-abbot (1142–1144)
Eberhard IV, Prince-abbot (1144–1147)
Fredeloch Vorbürger of Helmstorff, Prince-abbot (1147–1150)
Friedrich IV of Helmishofen, Prince-abbot (1150–1155)
Adalbert III, Prince-abbot (1155–1164)
Hartmann II, Prince-abbot (1164–1166)
Lantfried II, Prince-abbot (1166–1185)
Berthold II Hochberger, Prince-abbot (1185–1197)
Henry II, Prince-abbot (1197–?)

County of Württemberg (complete list) –
Conrad I, Count (pre-1081–1110)
Konrad II, Count (1110–1143)
Ludwig I, Count (1143–1158)
Ludwig II, Count (1158–1181)
Hartmann, Count (1181–1236)

Italy

Kingdom of Italy (complete list) –
Henry V, King (1098–1125)

Kingdom of Burgundy (later Arles)  (complete list) –
Henry IV, King (1056–1105)
Henry V, King (1105–1125)
Lothar III, King (1125–1137)
Conrad III, King (1138–1152)
Frederick I Barbarossa, King (1152–1190)
Henry VI, King (1190–1198)

Republic of Florence (complete list) –
Cosimo de' Medici, Gonfaloniere of Justice, de facto ruler (1434–1464)

March of Istria –
Burchard, Margrave (1093–1101)
Ulric II, Margrave (1098–1107)
Engelbert II, Margrave (1107–1124)
Engelbert III 1124–1173
Berthold I, Margrave (1173–1188)
Berthold II, Margrave (1188–1204)

County/ Principality of Orange (complete list) –
Raimbaut II, Count (?–c.1121)
Tiburtia I, Countess, (c.1121–pre–1150)
William of Aumelas, Count (pre–1150–1156)
Raimbaut d'Aurenga, Count (1156–1173)
Bertrand I, Prince (1173–1180)
William I, co-Prince (1180–pre–1219)
William II, co-Prince (1180–c.1239)

Papal States (complete list) –
Paschal II, Pope (1099–1118)
Gelasius II, Pope (1118–1119)
Callixtus II, Pope (1119–1124)
Honorius II, Pope (1124–1130)
Innocent II, Pope (1130–1143)
Celestine II, Pope (1143–1144)
Lucius II, Pope (1144–1145)
Eugene III, Pope (1145–1153)
Anastasius IV, Pope (1153–1154)
Adrian IV, Pope (1154–1159)
Alexander III, Pope (1159–1181)
Lucius III, Pope (1181–1185)
Urban III, Pope (1185–1187)
Gregory VIII, Pope (1187)
Clement III, Pope (1187–1191)
Celestine III, Pope (1191–1198)
Innocent III, Pope (1198–1216)

County of Savoy (complete list) –
Humbert II the Fat, Count (1082/91–1103)
Amadeus III, Count (1103–1148)
Humbert III the Blessed, Count (1148–1189)
Thomas, Count (1189–1233)

March of Tuscany (complete list) – 
Matilda, Margravine (1076–1115)

References

Bibliography

11th century
 
-
12th century in the Holy Roman Empire
12th-century people of the Holy Roman Empire